José Francisco Promis Hoyuelos or Jose F. Promis (born January 28, 1973 in Viña del Mar, Chile) is a Chilean-American singer-songwriter and composer, son of the well-known Chilean literature professor José Promis

Personal life
As a four-year-old he and his parents emigrated from Chile to Tucson, AZ, as his father fled from the Chilean regime under dictator Pinochet. Promis graduated from the University of Arizona in Media Arts & Journalism and in 1997 he moved to Los Angeles. Once Promis was settled, he began a career in music journalism that would see his reviews, retrospectives and the like feature at outlets such as All Music Guide and Billboard. During this period, Promis also began to learn how to write and compose songs via the piano which later led to him becoming a full-time musician in 2008.

Music career
Promis' music combination is a style of music which he calls "electric cabaret," songs that can either be played on a solo piano or arranged with electronics and real musicians.

Promis, Promis 2, Promis III (2005–2008)
His eponymous debut album was released in 2005 and revealed that Promis was already influenced by the French chanson method and adult pop music structure, but there was a decidedly lo-fi element to the long player. The second album Promis issued, Promis 2 (2007), uncovered further sonic touchstones which included classical, Gothic, Mediterranean, and Balkan music. In a review of Promis 2, reviewer Leonard Lair remarked of the album, "Promis 2 is too long an album to take in one sitting, but overall it's the slower, subtler songs that should ensure Promis has a future beyond the reputation of a showman."

From 2008 Promis teamed up with British producer Ian Matthews in Los Angeles, who produced the third album Promis III. Matthews would become a musical partner throughout his career. The basic idea for this album was to combine Promis chansons with electronic production, putting Promis' songs to darker synthesizer sound.

Life Is Grand! and Love Stories (2009–2011)
In 2009 Promis wanted a turn back to Mediterranean music and recorded Life Is Grand!, which was produced and co-written by New York-based Turkish music producer Ayhan Sahin. The album was released on Sahin's label "Young Pals Music" and featured a full pop sound where he partnered with several other singers like Karine Hannah on the song "Lovesick". Promis turned back on his original sound in 2011. He teamed up once again with Ian Matthews for his fifth album Love Stories (2011). This project was recorded as his mother was dying of terminal cancer, this is reflected in some of the album's darker material. But Love Stories also features lighter moments and selections inspired by Balkan sounds.

Vertigo Heights, Indiscretions, Sunset Blvd., Electric Cabaret, and Lust & Found (2012–Present Day) 

In 2012, Promis and his producer Matthews began work on Vertigo Heights, one of two albums to emerge from the pair in a four year span that combined cabaret and Balkan to electronic to straightforward pop/rock; Sunset Blvd. followed in 2015. Sunset Blvd. was inspired by the classic 1950 Billy Wilder film and included among its impressive song roster an electro-pop oriented cover of Amanda Lear's "The Sphinx." In a write-up on Sunset Blvd. from The Rainbow Hub, the reviewer stated, "Sunset Blvd." is a worthy listen that brings you intimately into a world that many of us dream of but few of us ever get a chance to see.

Regarding his solo output which Promis continued to do in between his team-up projects with Matthews; his sixth studio album Indiscretions was issued in 2014. Reviewer Leicester Bangs commented, "All in all it's the sort of record that the dedicated listener can really get their teeth into and I'm happy to recommend it – unreservedly." Having sharpened his handsome brand of quirky, erudite pop, Promis encountered a series of personal and professional changes in his life which helped to shape the next chapter of his artistic evolution. Promis' relocation from Los Angeles to Berlin in 2016 had a profound effect on the artist. Firstly, Promis decided to utilize his full name—José Promis—after years of being cautious about navigating a fickle American landscape where he would have been mistakenly pegged as a solely Latin oriented pop act. Secondly, now headquartered in Europe, Promis was free to embrace himself in a new way and responded accordingly to the bold, compelling German music scene he found himself immersed in. Promis articulated this transformation compellingly with Electric Cabaret (2017) and most recently Lust & Found (2020). The former record is his ninth effort and debut release on Darumeshi Records; it went on to produce the singles "Dragons," "We're Grown Up People", and "Can I Just See What it Feels Like to Kiss You."

The latter long player, his tenth, Lust & Found continues to move Promis' dashing and compelling sonic approach forward.

Musical and film
In the beginning of 2016 his original songs comprised most of the musical A Night at the Black Cat Theatre at the Edgemar Center for the Arts in Santa Monica.
Together with Juwelia St. St. he wrote the musical "Hungry Roses" which contains original songs by both with weird lyrics in English and German. Also, Promis plays the show "Black Market" with Parisian actress Anne Wagret performing songs by Kurt Weill, Friedrich Hollaender, Promis himself, and other artists

Promis and Juwelia St. St. will also appear in the movie "Überleben in Neukölln" (English: "Survival in Berlin-Neukölln") by German filmmaker Rosa von Praunheim, which premiered at the Filmfest München. Promis recounted his experience in Berlin which led him to work with Juwelia St. St., "The story is that in my early Berlin trips, musician friends of mine introduced me to underground drag legend Juwelia, and I became her composer, performing regularly at her salon Galerie Studio St. St. and that is what gave me my Berlin "fame" so to speak. The songs we wrote together, which are trashy Berlin cabaret songs, became the soundtrack to that film and were released as an album."

Discography

Albums
 Promis (2005)
 Promis 2 (2007)
 Promis III (2008)
 Life Is Grand! (2009)
 Love Stories (2011)
 Vertigo Heights (as Promis & Matthews) (2012)
 Indiscretions (2014)
 Sunset Blvd. (as Promis & Matthews) (2015)
 Electric Cabaret (2017)
 Lust & Found (2020)

Compilations
 2016 As Promised – The Best of Promis, Vol. 1 & 2
 2018 Disco Cabaret (Remix Album)

Singles and EPs
 2010 Say Good-Bye To Summer
 2014 Christmas With Our Friends
 2016 Martinis at Noon EP
 2016 The Sphinx (as Promis & Matthews)
 2016 50 Bucks From Me EP
 2016 Dragons EP
 2017 We're Grown Up People 
 2017 Can I Just See What It Feels Like to Kiss You
 2017 Flash and a Flame (feat. Juval Porat)

Musicals and shows
 "A Night at Black Cat Cabaret" Edgemar Center for the Arts, Santa Monica, CA (2008, 2016)
 "Hungry Roses" with Juwelia St. St. (2016)
 "Black Market" (songs by Kurt Weill, Marlene Dietrich a.o.) with Anne Wagret (2017)

Side projects
 2014 Fashion Invasion feat. Promis – Feeling Free (single/collaboration)
 2017 Promis x Flixxcore – 50 Bucks from Me 2K17 (single/collaboration)
 2017 Marq Aurel & Rayman Rave feat. Promis – In Time (single/collaboration)
 2017 "Hungry Roses" – An Evening With José Promis & Juwelia (soundtrack for the film "Überleben in Neukölln")

References

1973 births
Living people
American people of Chilean descent
People from Viña del Mar
Musicians from Viña del Mar